The Atlas Fire was a 2017 wildfire burning in Napa County, California north of the city of Napa, near Napa Soda Springs. It was one of fourteen large fires simultaneously burning in eight Northern California counties, in what was called the "Northern California firestorm". Governor Jerry Brown declared a state of emergency.

The fire, which started on October 8, had by October 12 burned  of land, and was 77% contained. 
By October 12, the fire stretched from Lake Berryessa south to Napa, but a firebreak was established across Atlas Peak Road.

The Fire

The fire began about 10 p.m. October 8 on Atlas Peak Road Atlas Peak. It started south, fed by winds, gusting to 28 miles per hour, and low relative humidity at 12%.

On October 12, winds were forecast to reach 40 mph, but were lighter than expected, slowing the growth of the fire.

Evacuations 
Evacuations started at Silverado Resort, and at Vichy Avenue and Hagen Road area, then Montecito Boulevard and Monte Vista Avenue.

After the evacuation center at Crosswalk Church quickly reached maximum capacity, one was opened at Napa Valley College and St. Apollinaris Catholic Church. 
There are other evacuations centers such as:
 Allan Witt Park, 1741 W Texas St, Fairfield, 
 Solano Community College, 4000 Suisun Valley Rd, Fairfield, and 
 Fairfield High School, 205 E. Atlantic Avenue, Fairfield.
 Sonoma Raceway open their campgrounds.

The evacuations for Solano County are Upper and Lower Green Valley, Eastridge, and the community of twin sisters along Suisun Valley road. The advisory is for the Lakes, and The Shopping Centers for Cordelia. 
In Sonoma, there were mandatory evacuation orders first at Seventh Street East, Castle Road, and Lovall Valley Road; then at East Napa Street. An evacuation advisory was issued for parts of the city of Napa.

See also
 Tubbs fire
 2017 California wildfires
 List of California wildfires
 October 2017 Northern California wildfires

References

External links

 1981 Atlas Peak fire

2017 California wildfires
Wildfires in Napa County, California
October 2017 events in the United States